The crista galli (Latin: "crest of the rooster") is the upper part of the perpendicular plate of the ethmoid bone of the skull. It rises above the cribriform plate. The falx cerebri (a fold of the dura mater surrounding the brain) attaches to the crista galli.

Structure 
The crista galli is the upper part of the perpendicular plate of the ethmoid bone of the skull. It rises above the cribriform plate. The falx cerebri (a fold of the dura mater surrounding the brain) attaches to the crista galli. The olfactory bulbs of the olfactory nerve lie on either side of the crista galli on top of the cribriform plate.

Variation in Morphology 
The base of crista galli varies in height. A retrospective study of CT data from 2007 to 2009 reviewed scans of 99 people. The results showed that in 63.6% of subjects the base extended less than 50% below the height of the cribriform plate. In 28.3%, the base did not extend above the cribriform plate, while in 8.1%, the base extended more than 50% of the CG height below the top of the cribriform plate.

References

External links 
 
 
 
 

Bones of the head and neck